Aberdeen F.C. competed in Scottish Football League Division One and Scottish Cup in season 1921–22.

Overview

Aberdeen finished in 15th place out of 22 clubs in Division One, missing out on relegation by five points. In the Scottish Cup, they made it through to the semi-final stage, but lost 3–1 to Morton at Dens Park, Dundee. New signing Johnny Miller scored a record 27 goals this season.

Results

Scottish Division One

Final standings

Scottish Cup

Squad

Appearances & Goals

|}

References

Aberdeen F.C. seasons
Aberdeen